Boris Arkadyevich Rybkinborn Boruch Aronovich Rivkin ; 19 June 189927 November 1947) was a Soviet diplomat and a secret agent of the NKVD. He worked as a junior diplomatic official as Boris Yartsev in the embassy of the Soviet Union in Helsinki.

Early life 
Rybkin was born Boruch Aronovich Rivkin in Novovitebsk, in the Khersonsky Uyezd of Kherson Governorate into a Ukrainian Jewish family on June 19, 1899.

Career 
Rybkin joined the Soviet secret police, the Cheka, in 1921 and the Bolshevik Party in 1922. He served in the Stalingrad district from 1924 to 1929. In 1931, he was sent to Tashkent, in Central Asia, and later to Iran. He also made business trips to France, Bulgaria and Austria.

In September 1935, Rybkin began to be posted as a second-class secretary to the Soviet embassy in Helsinki. In April 1938, Joseph Stalin gave Rybkin the mission to start secret negotiations with the Finnish government against the threat of Nazi Germany. In reality, the Soviet Union demanded some areas near Leningrad, fortification of Åland and other places. The demands changed many times, and the negotiations continued until March 1939, when they ended without result.

The Finnish government did not want to give up its neutrality or its territories. Later, Boris Shtein continued negotiations but also unsuccessfully. The Soviet Union attacked Finland on 30 November 1939 and started the Winter War.

In 1941, Rybkin moved to the Soviet embassy in Stockholm. He returned to the Soviet Union in Autumn 1943. During the Second World War, he served as a chief under the NKGB in the Northern Caucasus. Rybkin was an agent at the Yalta Conference in 1945. In February 1947, he began to serve in the MGB.

Death
Rybkin died in a car crash in Czechoslovakia in 1947.

References

1899 births
1947 deaths
People from Dnipropetrovsk Oblast
People from Khersonsky Uyezd
Ukrainian Jews
Bolsheviks
Communist Party of the Soviet Union members
NKVD officers
Soviet diplomats
Soviet Jews
State Political Directorate officers
Winter War
Recipients of the Order of Lenin
Recipients of the Order of the Red Banner